Trainfest is a model railroad show that takes place annually in the Milwaukee suburb West Allis, Wisconsin. According to the show’s organizers, it is “America’s largest operating model railroad show” and markets itself to both hobbyists and young families.

History
Trainfest started in 1971 as a one-day show in a Milwaukee Veterans of Foreign Wars hall. Despite a faltering economy, total attendance in 2008 rose to 21,621 from 20,979 in 2007.

Trainfest serves as both a showcase for trends in model railroading and a place where model railroaders can connect to share ideas about their hobby. Trainfest features at least 50 operating layouts from Z to G scale, some constructed by hobbyists and some constructed commercially. Over 60 manufacturers (including industry giants such as Walthers, Athearn, Bachmann Industries, Lionel, Atlas, Kalmbach, Märklin, and MTH Electric Trains) and 50 hobby dealers from across the country showcase their newest products and sample layouts.

Since there'll be no event planned in 2020, the 50th was deferred to 2021.

Currently
In 2008, 12 historical groups also exhibited at Trainfest. Some exhibitors featured layouts depicting scenes from historical Wisconsin, including mining and logging, farm, and river and lake scenes.

In a 2008 West Allis Now feature story, executive director John Tews was quoted as saying, “Some people think Trainfest is just a collector’s event, but it’s an event for everyone.” One of Trainfest’ stated goals is “passing along the traditional hobby of model railroading to a new generation.” The festival offers free admission to youngsters under 14 (with a coupon available on its Web site). Some exhibits are aimed toward children, such as a layout built from LEGO blocks, a kid-sized circus train replica, and interactive racing features. Trainfest has also partnered with Radio Disney to offer a live show and craft booth for the children in attendance.

See also
Rail transport modelling
Milwaukee: City of Festivals

References

External links
Trainfest
Tracking America Episode 1: Trainfest
National Model Railroad Association
Early History of Model Railroading
Trainfest 2009 Official Promotion Video

Festivals in Wisconsin
Model railway shows and exhibitions